Zazeran (also Romanized as Zāzerān)  is a city in the Central District of Falavarjan County, Isfahan Province, Iran.  At the 2006 census, its population was 7,670, in 2,003 families.

For its public transit system, The city is served by Falavarjan County Municipalities Mass Transit Organization bus network route 6.

References

Populated places in Falavarjan County

Cities in Isfahan Province